William Dwight Schultz (born November 24, 1947) is an American television, film and voice actor. 

He is known for his roles as Captain "Howling Mad" Murdock on the 1980s action series The A-Team and as Reginald Barclay in the Star Trek franchise. 

He is also known in animation as the mad scientist Dr. Animo in the Ben 10 series, Adrian Toomes/Vulture in some Marvel video games, Chef Mung Daal in the children's animated series Chowder, and Eddie the Squirrel in CatDog.

Early life
Schultz was born in Baltimore in 1947. He is of German descent and a Roman Catholic. He attended Calvert Hall College High School and Towson University.

Career
Schultz's breakthrough role was that of Captain "Howling Mad" Murdock on The A-Team. He appeared in several films, including The Fan (1981), and he starred in Fat Man and Little Boy (1989) as J. Robert Oppenheimer. In the early 1990s, he had a recurring role as Lieutenant Reginald Barclay in Star Trek: The Next Generation; he reprised the role in Star Trek: Voyager and the film Star Trek: First Contact. He played in the 1992 television film Child of Rage, starring opposite Mel Harris as a compassionate couple who adopt a troubled girl who has been sexually abused. In November 2009, Schultz confirmed that he and former A-Team co-star Dirk Benedict would make cameo appearances in the feature film The A-Team.

Schultz hosted a conservative talk-radio podcast called Howling Mad Radio which ended in March 2009. He has also guest-hosted on numerous occasions for Michael Savage on The Savage Nation, Jerry Doyle on The Jerry Doyle Show, and Rusty Humphries on The Rusty Humphries Show. He also posts political commentaries and podcasts on his official fansite. Schultz has also written for Breitbart where he likened liberalism to mental illness, and has similarly suggested that President Barack Obama's administration may intend to force sex reassignment surgery onto him and others.

Personal life
Schultz married actress Wendy Fulton in 1983. Their daughter Ava (born 1987) serves in the United States Marine Corps.

Schultz is a Roman Catholic and a conservative. In 2012 he began regular appearances on The Glazov Gang, an Internet political talk show hosted by Jamie Glazov, managing editor of FrontPage Magazine.

Filmography

Film

Television

Video games

Broadway
Night and Day
The Crucifer of Blood
The Water Engine

Radio
Dark Matters Radio with Don Ecker and Special Co-Host Dwight Schultz
Howling Mad Radio
The Jerry Doyle Show
The Laura Ingraham Show
The Rusty Humphries Show
The Savage Nation

References

External links

 
 
 
 
 

1947 births
Living people
20th-century American male actors
21st-century American male actors
American bloggers
American male bloggers
American male film actors
American male stage actors
American male television actors
American male video game actors
American male voice actors
American podcasters
American people of German descent
American Roman Catholics
California Republicans
Calvert Hall College High School alumni
Cartoon Network people
Male actors from Maryland
Maryland Republicans
People from Baltimore
Towson University alumni